The British Colonial Taxpayers and All Workers Union was a trade union in Trinidad and Tobago that merged in 1959 with the Federated Workers Trade Union.

See also
 List of trade unions
 National Union of Government and Federated Workers

References

Defunct trade unions of Trinidad and Tobago